Brock R. Tredway (born June 23, 1959) is a Canadian former professional ice hockey winger. He played one playoff game in the National Hockey League with the Los Angeles Kings during the 1981–82 season, on April 19, 1982 against the Vancouver Canucks. The rest of his career, which lasted from 1981 until 1986, was mainly spent in the American Hockey League.

Biography
As a youth, Tredway played in the 1972 Quebec International Pee-Wee Hockey Tournament with a minor ice hockey team from Scarborough, Toronto.

A 1981 graduate of Cornell University, he played four seasons with the Cornell Big Red and was a member of the Quill and Dagger society. Tredway holds a number of all-time Cornell Career records including Goals Scored (113), Game Winning Goals (15), Hat Tricks (13),and Power Play Goals (46).

After graduation, Tredway joined the American Hockey League's New Haven Nighthawks. He played one game in the National Hockey League with the Los Angeles Kings during the 1982 Stanley Cup Playoffs.

Career statistics

Regular season and playoffs

Awards and honors

See also
 List of players who played only one game in the NHL

References

External links
 

1959 births
Living people
Canadian ice hockey right wingers
Cornell Big Red men's ice hockey players
EC KAC players
New Haven Nighthawks players
Los Angeles Kings players
Ice hockey people from Toronto
Undrafted National Hockey League players